Doloma is a monotypic moth genus in the family Geometridae. Its only species, Doloma leucocephala, is known from Madagascar. Both the genus and species were first described by Louis Beethoven Prout in 1922.

References

Geometrinae
Moths of Madagascar
Moths of Africa